Major General Archibald Hayes Macdonell,  (February 6, 1868 – November 12, 1939) was a Canadian soldier and politician.

Biography 
Born in Toronto, Ontario, the third son of late Angus Duncan Macdonell and Pauline Rosalie De-la-haye, Macdonell served in the Canadian Militia in South Africa, Southern Nigeria, and West Africa. He attended staff college, passing there in 1906. During World War I, he commanded the 5th Canadian Infantry Brigade. After the war, as a major general, he was the commanding officer of the military district of New Brunswick. In 1921, he was summoned to the Senate of Canada for the senatorial division of Toronto South, Ontario on the advice of Conservative Prime Minister Arthur Meighen. He served until his death in 1939.

His brother, Angus Claude Macdonell, was an MP and senator.

Archives 
There is an Archibald Hayes Macdonell fonds at Library and Archives Canada.

References

External links
 
 

1868 births
1939 deaths
Military personnel from Toronto
Canadian generals of World War I
Canadian Expeditionary Force officers
Canadian senators from Ontario
Canadian Companions of the Distinguished Service Order
Canadian Companions of the Order of St Michael and St George
Conservative Party of Canada (1867–1942) senators
Politicians from Toronto
Canadian military personnel of the Second Boer War
Graduates of the Staff College, Camberley
People from Old Toronto

Canadian Militia officers
Royal Canadian Regiment officers